Nathan Sawaya (born July 10, 1973) is an American artist who builds custom three-dimensional sculptures and large-scale mosaics from popular everyday items and is best known for his work with standard Lego building bricks.

Biography
Born in Colville, Washington and raised in Veneta, Oregon, Sawaya attended New York University, where he earned bachelor's and law degrees, eventually practicing law at the firm Winston & Strawn in Hollywood.

He first came to national attention in 2004, when he left his job as an attorney to work full-time as a Lego artist.

After working for the Lego Group less than six months, he branched off and in 2004 opened an art studio in New York City. As a professional artist, Sawaya is not an employee of the toy company.  However, he has been officially recognized by The Lego Group as one of the best Lego builders in the world and is endorsed as a Lego Certified Professional.

Sawaya's art creations include a -long replica of the Brooklyn Bridge, a life-size tyrannosaurus rex, a -tall Han Solo frozen in carbonite. His signature pieces include human form sculptures titled "Yellow", "Red" and "Blue". "Blue" sold for an undisclosed sum at the Agora Gallery in 2010.

He had his first solo art exhibit in the Spring of 2007 at the Lancaster Museum of Art.  "The Art of the Brick" is one of the first major museum exhibition in the world to focus exclusively on the use of Lego building blocks as an art medium.

Sawaya had his first exhibition in the Southern Hemisphere at Federation Square in Melbourne, Australia in June 2011. The exhibition since traveled around Australia, including stops in Adelaide and at the Sydney Town Hall.

In July 2012 Sawaya's Asian tour began with record-breaking shows in Taipei, Kaohsiung and Taichung. He has also exhibited at the world famous ArtScience Museum at Marina Bay Sands in Singapore (November 2012 - May 2013) and Discovery Times Square in New York City (June 2013 - current).  His tours have repeatedly broken attendance records and been widely acclaimed.

Collections/Installations

Sawaya keeps two, full-time working art studios - one in Manhattan and the other in Los Angeles.  It is estimated that Sawaya owns more Lego bricks than any other single individual with 1.5 million bricks in each of his studios.

In 2012, Artnet ranked Sawaya the 8th most popular artist in the world.  His artwork is commissioned by collectors, athletes and celebrities.

Nathan Sawaya's work is in many collections, including:
 The Strong National Museum of Play in Rochester, New York
 Time Warner Center public art display in New York, New York
 The National Museum of the Marine Corps in Quantico, Virginia
 The New Orleans Public Library public art display in New Orleans, Louisiana
 MASS MoCA in North Adams, Massachusetts

And has been featured at museum venues worldwide, including:
 The Imperial Centre for the Arts & Sciences in Downtown Rocky Mount, North Carolina.
 Kimball Art Center in Park City, Utah
 John F. Kennedy Center in Washington, DC
 Oregon Museum of Science and Industry in Portland, Oregon
 Nassau County Museum of Art in Roslyn Harbor, New York
 Morris Museum in Morristown, New Jersey
 Clinton Library in Little Rock, Arkansas
 Mesa Contemporary Arts Center in Mesa, Arizona
 Narrows Center for the Arts in Fall River, Massachusetts
 Mulvane Art Museum in Topeka, Kansas
 Crisp Museum in Cape Girardeau, Missouri
 Columbus Museum of Art in Columbus, Ohio
 Art & Culture Center in Hollywood, Florida
 The Ambassador Theatre in Dublin, Ireland
 The Loading Bay Gallery in London, United Kingdom

Press
Sawaya has also been featured on multiple media outlets including The Colbert Report, where he presented Stephen Colbert with a life-sized replica of Stephen Colbert; CBS's the Late Show with David Letterman; NBC's Today Show; TBS's Conan; ABC’S Jimmy Kimmel Live!; Newsweek; the Los Angeles Times; The Hollywood Reporter; CNN; and The Wall Street Journal. In April 2009, he was a consultant on Mythbusters. He also served as a consulting producer on the American version of Lego Masters, helping to design sets and challenges.

References

External links
 
 Personal portfolio with descriptions and photos of all building projects.

1973 births
Living people
People from Colville, Washington
Pacific Northwest artists
20th-century American sculptors
People associated with Winston & Strawn
New York University alumni
Sculptors from Washington (state)
21st-century American sculptors
Lego people